Le Bersac is a commune in the Hautes-Alpes department in southeastern France.

Population

Tourism
Although now emerging as a preferred tourist destination, the area has retained its charm and character. Restaurants, fishing, hiking, swimming, off-road exploring, and cross-country skiing are just some of the many activities available. The favourable weather patterns and local alpine ski areas make this a top year-round destination.

See also
Communes of the Hautes-Alpes department

References

External links
Official site

Communes of Hautes-Alpes